Scaeosopha rarimaculata is a species of moth of the family Cosmopterigidae. It is found in Brunei.

The wingspan is about 14.5 mm. The ground colour of the forewings is whitish-yellow, overlaid with brown or dark-brown spots and patches. The hindwings are yellowish-brown.

Etymology
The species name refers to the forewing having sparse spots and patches and is derived the Latin prefix rari- (meaning rare) and maculatus (meaning macular).

References

Moths described in 2012
Scaeosophinae